The 2017 Currie Cup Premier Division was the top tier of the 2017 Currie Cup competition, an annual South African rugby union competition organised by the South African Rugby Union. It was the 79th edition of the competition and was contested between 21 July and 28 October 2017.

Competition rules and information

There were seven participating teams in the 2017 Currie Cup Premier Division. These seven teams played twice against each other over the course of the competition, once at home and once away. Teams received four points for a win and two points for a draw. Bonus points were be awarded to teams that scored 4 or more tries in a game, as well as to teams that lost a match by 7 points or less. Teams were ranked by log points, then points difference (points scored less points conceded).

The top four teams qualified for the semi-finals, which was be followed by a final.

Teams

The teams that participated in the 2017 Currie Cup Premier Division were:

Pool stage

Standings
The final log for the 2017 Currie Cup Premier Division was:

Round-by-round

The table below shows a team's progression throughout the season. For each round, each team's cumulative points total is shown with the overall log position in brackets.

Matches

Round One

Round Two

Round Three

Round Four

Round Five

Round Six

Round Seven

Round Eight

Round Nine

Round Ten

Round Eleven

Round Twelve

Round Thirteen

Round Fourteen

Play-offs

Title play-offs

Semifinals

Final

Relegation play-off

  remain in the Currie Cup Premier Division for 2018.
  remain in the Currie Cup First Division for 2018.

Honours

The honour roll for the 2017 Currie Cup Premier Division was as follows:

Players

Squads

The following squads were named for the 2017 Currie Cup Premier Division:

References

 
2017
2017 in South African rugby union
2017 rugby union tournaments for clubs